Beechwood Park is a thirty-acre public park situated in the eastern Beechwood area of the city of Newport, South Wales. The park is listed on the Cadw/ICOMOS Register of Parks and Gardens of Special Historic Interest in Wales.

History 
Beechwood House was built in 1877-78 as a private residence by George Fothergill, a former Mayor of Newport. It was designed in a classical style using Bath stone, by architects Habershon, Pite & Fawckner. In 1900 the Beechwood estate was purchased by Newport Corporation and opened as a public park.

During World War II the park was used by US military personnel stationed in the city and was later used as a tuberculosis clinic, model railway club, and open air school.

Community 
The Park is protected by a group of local volunteers in the Beechwood Park Group, who set up in 2014 with the purpose of organising events for local people and improving the facilities available to visitors, including raising £1,850 for new parasols for outdoor seating.

The Park's historical interests are also preserved by Friends of Newport's Ornamental Parks, who were established in 2006 to improve the management of Victorian era parks in the city.

Facilities 
Current facilities include two children's play areas, a paddling pool (summer only), a bowling green, a pavilion, and two tennis courts.

In 2013 a café was opened and named Mrs T's. It is open between 9.30am and 4.30pm Monday to Friday, and 9am to 5pm on Saturday and Sunday. The café was extended in 2018 and owner Jayne Thorley has described the new space as suited for afternoon tea, Sunday lunches and special events.

In 2019 the park hosted a weekend of free musical entertainment organised by the Beechwood Parks Events Group in conjunction with Newport City Radio with a range of musical guests, a raffle, food from The Café, and more.

Renovation 
In 2006, work began on the renovation and conversion of Beechwood House to become the Beechwood House Entrepreneurship Centre. Newport City Council secured a total of £4.2million of funding from the European Regional Development Fund (ERDF), Welsh Government Local Regeneration Fund, along with further retrospective ERDF funds, for the project. The Centre opened in March 2009.

Awards 
Beechwood is listed on the Cadw/ICOMOS Register of Parks and Gardens of Special Historic Interest in Wales. It has held a Green Flag award from Keep Wales Tidy since 2007.

References

External links
Newport City Council Countryside & Parks
The Café at Beechwood
Beechwood Park Group BPG
 Friends of Newport Ornamental Parks

Parks in Newport, Wales
History of Newport, Wales
Registered historic parks and gardens in Newport